Vladyslav Yuriyovych Piskunov (born 7 June 1978 in Nova Kakhovka, Kherson) is a former Ukrainian hammer thrower.

Piskunov originally won a gold medal at the 1994 World Junior Championships, but failed a drugs test and became disqualified. At the 2005 World Championships he failed another test and received a life ban.

His personal best throw was 82.23 metres, achieved in April 2002 in Koncha-Zaspa.

Achievements

See also
List of doping cases in athletics

References

1978 births
Living people
Ukrainian male hammer throwers
Olympic male hammer throwers
Olympic athletes of Ukraine
Athletes (track and field) at the 2000 Summer Olympics
Athletes (track and field) at the 2004 Summer Olympics
Universiade medalists in athletics (track and field)
World Athletics Championships athletes for Ukraine
World Athletics Championships medalists
European Athletics Championships medalists
Doping cases in athletics
Ukrainian sportspeople in doping cases
Universiade silver medalists for Ukraine
Universiade bronze medalists for Ukraine
People from Nova Kakhovka
Sportspeople from Kherson Oblast